Macarostola thriambica is a moth of the family Gracillariidae. It is known from Sri Lanka.

References

Macarostola
Moths of Sri Lanka
Moths described in 1907